Bella Center station is a rapid transit station on the Copenhagen Metro. It is served by the M1 line. The station is elevated from ground level and opened on 19 October 2002. It is located in fare zone 3 and named after the Bella Center, a congress center located to the west of this station.

References

External links

Bella Center station on www.m.dk 
Bella Center station on www.m.dk 

M1 (Copenhagen Metro) stations
Railway stations opened in 2002
2002 establishments in Denmark
Railway stations in Denmark opened in the 21st century